Massena International Airport  (Richards Field) is in St. Lawrence County, New York. The airport sees one airline, subsidized by the Essential Air Service program.

Federal Aviation Administration records say the airport had 971 passenger boardings (enplanements) in calendar year 2008, 3,252 in 2009 and 3,350 in 2010. The National Plan of Integrated Airport Systems for 2011–2015 categorized it as a general aviation airport.

Facilities 

In the year ending June 30, 2011 the airport had 9,040 aircraft operations, average 24 per day: 68% general aviation, 24% air taxi, and 8% military.
10 aircraft were then based at this airport: 90% single-engine and 10% multi-engine.

Air cargo, charter, limo, courier, and overnight express, and full service for jet refueling are offered. The airport has VOR, ILS, and RNAV navigational approaches. The airport is an uncontrolled airport with no control tower.

Massena, New York does not have international service. It is an "International Airport" as a United States Customs Service port of entry for planes entering the United States from foreign countries. A one-hour advance ETA notice is required for unscheduled flights.

Airline and destinations 

The airport is served by Boutique Air, with direct flights to Boston Logan International Airport and Baltimore/Washington International Airport. Boutique Air has codeshare agreements with United Airlines and American Airlines, allowing passengers seamless connections to domestic flights at both airports. Prior to Boutique Air's service, the airport was served by Cape Air, and earlier by Big Sky Airlines, with flights to Baltimore and Boston (via Ogdensburg International Airport and Watertown International Airport in 2007). Prior to that, service was on Air Midwest, with flights to Pittsburgh International Airport.

The first airline flights were Colonial DC-3s in 1946; successor Eastern pulled out in 1961, replaced by Mohawk, which left in 1969–70.

Statistics

References

Other sources 

 Essential Air Service documents (Docket OST-1997-2842) from the U.S. Department of Transportation:
 Order 2005-5-8: reselects Mesa Air Group, Inc., d/b/a Air Midwest, to continue providing essential air service (EAS) at Massena, Ogdensburg and Watertown, New York, for a two-year period, and establishes an annual subsidy of $1,757,834 for service consisting of three round trips each weekday and three over the weekend period between the communities and Pittsburgh, with 19-seat Beech 1900D aircraft.
 Order 2006-12-22: selecting Big Sky Transportation Co., a wholly owned subsidiary of MAIR Holdings, Inc. d/b/a Big Sky Airlines, to provide essential air service (EAS) at Massena, Ogdensburg, and Watertown, New York, consisting of 18 weekly round trips, three each weekday and three each weekend, to Boston, with 19-seat Beech 1900D turboprop aircraft for the two-year period beginning on or about March 1, 2007, at a combined annual subsidy of $2,097,906.
 Order 2008-3-15: selecting Hyannis Air Service, Inc. d/b/a Cape Air, to provide subsidized essential air service (EAS) at Massena, Ogdensburg, and Watertown, New York, for the two-year period beginning when the carrier inaugurates full EAS pursuant to this Order, at a total annual subsidy of $3,879,863.
 Order 2011-1-6: selecting Hyannis Air Service, Inc. d/b/a Cape Air, to continue providing subsidized essential air service (EAS) at Massena (for two years), at the annual subsidy rate of $1,708,911.

External links 
 Massena International Airport
 Massena, New York
  at New York State DOT Airport Directory

Airports in New York (state)
Essential Air Service
Transportation buildings and structures in St. Lawrence County, New York